Save His Soul is the third studio album by American jam band Blues Traveler, released on April 6, 1993, by A&M Records.

Track listing
">" indicates a segue directly into the next track.

"Trina Magna" (John Popper) – 5:49
"Love and Greed" (Chan Kinchla, Popper) – 4:14
"Letter from a Friend" (Popper, Bobby Sheehan) – 4:39
"Believe Me" (Kinchla, Popper) – 3:33
"Go Outside and Drive" > (Popper) – 4:50
"Defense & Desire" (Popper, Sheehan) – 3:58
"Whoops" (Popper) – 8:17
"Manhattan Bridge" (Kinchla) – 2:47
"Love of My Life" (Popper) – 5:39
"NY Prophesie" (Kinchla, Popper) – 4:35
"Save His Soul" (Brendan Hill) – 3:12
"Bullshitter's Lament" > (Popper) – 3:28
"Conquer Me" > (Popper, Sheehan) – 5:09
"Fledgling" (Popper) – 7:25

Personnel
John Popper – vocals, harmonica, electric and 12-string acoustic guitars, Irish whistle, string arrangements
Bobby Sheehan – bass guitar
Brendan Hill – percussion, drums
Chan Kinchla – electric and 12-string acoustic guitars
Paul Shaffer – Hammond organ
Avram Lavinsky – string arrangements

Background vocals:
Pamela Landrum
Pat Bickham
Cher Levis
Mari Serpas

Strings:
Clay Ruede
Mitchell Stern
Roberta Cooper
Ronald Carbone
Jeff Carney

Certifications

Miscellaneous

"Letter from a Friend" was written for Dave Graham, the son of famed music promoter Bill Graham, following his death in 1991.
"Defense and Desire" is about the Nightingale Bar in Manhattan.
Kyle Duke is the child featured on the album cover.
In the liner notes, Popper is also listed as "playing" a 12-gauge shotgun and a 9 mm pistol; a gunshot is heard at the end of "Save His Soul."

References

1993 albums
A&M Records albums
Blues Traveler albums